The Societatea de Transport Public Timișoara S.A. commonly abbreviated STPT, is the primary public transport operator in the city of Timișoara. STPT is owned by the city, and covers the entire urban public transport, it operates the tram (7 lines), the trolleybus (8 lines), the urban bus transport (12 lines + 8 express routes and 16 metropolitan routes), the waterbus public transport on the Bega Canal and the VeloTM bicycle-sharing system. 90 million passengers are transported annually, of which 52 million by tram.

Societatea de Transport Public Timișoara lines

Bus routes
 Line 3: Timișoara Nord railway station – Str. Pop de Băsești – P-ța Iuliu Maniu – Str. Banatul – Dâmbovița – Auto High School – Sugar Factory
 Line 21: Banatim – Iosif Vulcan – Plopi Secondary school
 Line 28: P-ța V. Economu – Uzinei – Țițeica
 Line 32: P-ța Mocioni – Bd. C. Brâncoveanu – Bd. Liviu Rebreanu – Mureș – Timișoara South railway station
 Line 33: Pod C. Șagului (Shopping City Timișoara) – Calea Șagului – P-ța Iuliu Maniu – P-ța Al. Mocioni – Timișoara Orthodox Cathedral
 Line 33/barat: Timișoara Orthodox Cathedral – P-ța Al. Mocioni – P-ța Iuliu Maniu – Calea Șagului – Shopping City Timișoara – Metro
 Line 40: Str. T. Grozăvescu – Iulius Mall – Timișoara East railway station – Sf. Apostoli Petru și Pavel – Calea Lipovei
 Line 46: Village Museum (Timișoara Zoo) – Str. A. Imbroane – Str. M. Kogălniceanu – Bd. Take Ionescu – Bastion – Forestry High School – Village Museum (Timișoara Zoo)
 Line E1: Pod C. Șagului (Shopping City Timișoara) – P-ța Iuliu Maniu – Timișoara Nord railway station – C. Circumvalațiunii – C. Torontalului – Str. Liege – Selgros – Str. Tristan Tzara
 Line E2: Sf. Apostoli Petru și Pavel – Stuparilor – P-ța Consiliul Europei (Iulius Mall) – Poșta Mare – Str. Cluj – A.E.M. – Continental Automotive
 Line E3: Apicultorilor – Muzicescu – Calea Martirilor – Str. Cluj – University – Timișoara Orthodox Cathedral – Timișoara Nord railway station
 Line E4: Bastion – P-ța Badea Cârțan – Timișoara Airport – Aeroport neighbourhood
 Line E4b: Ghe. Barițiu – Timișoara Nord railway station – P-ța 700 – Bastion – P-ța Badea Cârțan – Timișoara Airport
 Line E6: Bastion – P-ța Consiliul Europei – Calea Aradului – Metro II – Industrial and Technological Park
 Line E7: T. Grozăvescu – University – P-ța Iuliu Maniu – Dâmbovița – P-ța Petofi Sandor – Sugar Factory – Abattoir
 Line E8: Pod C. Șagului (Shopping City Timișoara) – Calea Șagului – Bd. Mihai Viteazul – University – Bd. Vasile Pârvan – P-ța Prințul Turcesc – Str. Câmpului – Plopi Secondary school

Metropolitan bus routes
 Line M22: P-ța Ghe. Domășnean – Ciarda Roșie – Moșnița Nouă – Albina
 Line M29: P-ța V. Economu – Uzinei – Aleea Ghirodei – Ghiroda bridge
 Line M35: Bastion – P-ța B.Cârțan – Giarmata Vii railway station – Giarmata Vii church
 Line M44: Banatim – Prefectură – P-ța Consiliul Europei (Iulius Mall) – Becicherecu Mic

Trolleybus routes

 Line 11: Gh. Barițiu – Timișoara Nord railway station – P-ța Regina Maria – P-ța 700 – Bastion – Ștrandul Tineretului
 Line 13: Divizia 9 Cavalerie – P-ța Consiliul Europei (Iulius Mall) – P-ța Mărăști – P-ța 700 – Str. Cloșca – Piața de Gros – Pasaj C. F. Mehala (temporarily served by buses)
 Line 14: Gh. Barițiu – Timișoara Nord railway station – Regina Maria – P-ța 700 – P-ța Consiliul Europei (Iulius Mall) – Str. I. Ionescu de la Brad
 Line 15: Str. T. Grozăvescu – Complexul Studențesc – Calea Martirilor – Apicultorilor
 Line 16: Str. T. Grozăvescu – Timișoara Orthodox Cathedral – University – Complexul Studențesc – Regional Hospital Timișoara – B-dul Sudului
 Line 17: H. Baader (P-ța Badea Cârțan) – Bastion – P-ța Consiliul Europei (Iulius Mall) – University of Agricultural Sciences
 Line 18: C.P. Solventul – Timișoara Nord railway station – P-ța Regina Maria – P-ța 700 – P-ța Consiliul Europei (Iulius Mall) – Str. Liege

Metropolitan trolleybus lines
 Line M11: Gh. Barițiu – Timișoara Nord railway station – Regina Maria – P-ța 700 – Bastion – Ștrandul Tineretului – Ghiroda (thru City Hall)
 Line M14: Gh. Barițiu – Timișoara Nord railway station – Regina Maria – P-ța 700 – P-ța Consiliul Europei (Iulius Mall) – str. I. Ionescu de la Brad – Dumbrăvița (thru City Hall) – Timișoara bypass-north

Tram routes

 Line 1: Timișoara Nord railway station – Regele Carol – P-ța Maria – P-ța Timișoara 700 – P-ța Traian – UMT – Timișoara East railway station – P-ța Traian
 Line 2: Shopping City Timișoara – Calea Șagului – B-dul Dâmbovița – Regele Carol – P-ța Maria – P-ța Timișoara 700 – P-ța Traian – Timișoara East railway station – UMT – P-ța Traian
 Line 4: Calea Torontalului – Balta Verde – P-ța Timișoara 700 – P-ța Traian – Banatim – P-ța Ghe. Domășnean – Ciarda Roșie
 Line 5 (temporarily served by minibuses): Ronaț – Balta Verde –  P-ța 700 – P-ța Traian – UMT – Timișoara East railway station – P-ța Traian
 Line 6A: Timișoara Orthodox Cathedral – P-ța Maria – P-ța Bălcescu – Banatim  – P-ța Traian – P-ța Timișoara 700 (circuit) 
 Line 6B: Timișoara Orthodox Cathedral – P-ța 700 – P-ța Traian – Banatim – P-ța Bălcescu – P-ța Maria (circuit)
 Line 7: B-dul Dâmbovița – Calea Șagului – Str. Lidia – Drubeta – P-ța Bălcescu – P-ța Maria – P-ța 700 – Balta Verde – Calea Torontalului
 Line 8: Timișoara Nord railway station – Regele Carol – P-ța Maria – P-ța Bălcescu – Banatim – P-ța Ghe. Domășnean – Ciarda Roșie
 Line 9: Timișoara Nord railway station – Regele Carol – B-dul Dâmbovița – Calea Șagului – Drubeta – Timișoara Regional Hospital – P-ța Ghe. Domășnean – Ciarda Roșie

Waterbus routes

 Line V1: upstream direction: Ardealul (Modoș Rail Bridge) – Constantin Brâncoveanu (The Golf on the Bega Canal) – Ștefan cel Mare (Dragalina Boulevard) – Sfânta Maria – Catedrala Mitropolitană (The Metropolitan Cathedral) – Vasile Pârvan (Michelangelo bridge) – Corneliu Coposu (The Prefecture) – Dacia (Badea Cârțan Market) – Mihai Viteazu (Dorobanților neighborhood)

Fleet
The fleet consists of:
 Trams:
 GT4 (Hansa and Wegmann);
 30 GT4MT Armonia (rebuilt GT4 by Astra Arad and Electroputere VFU Pașcani);
 12 Duewag GT6 & GT8; 
 21 Rathgeber P 3.16; 
 16 new Bozankaya low-floor trams were ordered in July 2019, with the first cars entering revenue service expected in 2021;
 Trolleybuses:
 50 Škoda 24Tr Irisbus;
 Buses:
 55 Mercedes-Benz Conecto C; 
 30 Conecto G; 
 21 Cibro minibuses;
 7 waterbuses, constructed by Spatyard SRL in Galați

See also
 List of bus operating companies
 List of trolleybus systems
 List of tram and light rail transit systems
 List of town tramway systems in Romania

References

External links
 Tram Travels: Societatea de Transport Public Timișoara (STPT)

Timișoara
Timișoara
Timișoara
Timișoara
Timișoara
Transport in Timișoara